The Lakers–Pistons rivalry is an American professional basketball rivalry between the Los Angeles Lakers and Detroit Pistons. This rivalry, which was showcased three times in the NBA Finals (1988, 1989, 2004), pitted the All-Star filled Lakers teams against the blue collar, team-first oriented Pistons squads. Despite playing the role of underdog in all three of their final round meetings with Los Angeles, Detroit enjoyed significant success against the Lakers, claiming the NBA title against them twice.

History

1950–1962
Prior to facing each other in the 1988, 1989, and 2004 Finals, the Lakers and Pistons squared off in nine postseason series between 1950 and 1962. Both teams originally came from the NBL, one of two predecessors of the NBA. The Lakers were originally the Detroit Gems before moving to Minneapolis, while the Pistons were originally based in Fort Wayne, Indiana before moving to Detroit.

The Lakers, featuring stars such as George Mikan, Elgin Baylor, and Jerry West, defeated the Pistons of Andy Phillip, George Yardley, and Earl Lloyd in eight of the nine playoff meetings. The Lakers would appear in seven NBA Finals and won five titles during that era. The only Pistons victory came in the  playoffs, en route to their first of two consecutive trips to the NBA Finals.

After 1962, the Pistons declined from prominence and would not return to title contention until the mid-1980s with the arrivals of Isiah Thomas, Joe Dumars, Bill Laimbeer, and coach Chuck Daly. Meanwhile, the Lakers appeared in 12 of the next 25 NBA Finals and won five titles behind players such as Baylor, West, Wilt Chamberlain, Magic Johnson, and Kareem Abdul-Jabbar.

Prior to 1978, the Pistons and Lakers were both members of the Western Division/Conference in all but three seasons. Detroit moved to the Eastern Conference before the 1978–79 season, and both teams are currently guaranteed to meet only twice per season.

1988
The Lakers and Pistons renewed their acquaintances in the 1988 NBA Finals. Los Angeles swept the San Antonio Spurs in the opening round, but they needed 7 games to knock off both the Utah Jazz in the Western semifinals and the Dallas Mavericks in the Western Conference Finals. Still, the Lakers, who finished the season with a 62–20 record, were heavily favored to defeat the Pistons and become the first team since the 1969 Boston Celtics to repeat as NBA champions. Detroit finished their campaign with a 54–28 record, they defeated the Washington Bullets in the opening round and the Chicago Bulls in the conference semifinals, both in five games each. They survived a tough, 6-game Eastern Conference Finals series against the Boston Celtics to reach the final round. The series started out with a customary kiss between Magic Johnson and Isiah Thomas, who were close friends off the court. However, there would soon be no love lost between both teams. After defeating the Lakers with a 105–93 shocker in Game 1 at The L.A. Forum, the Pistons fought hard with Los Angeles and even took a 3–2 series lead heading into Game 6, which proved to be a classic battle, with Isiah Thomas overcoming a badly sprained ankle to score 25 points in the 3rd quarter. However, the contest ended on a sour note for Detroit. With the Pistons leading 102–101 with 14 seconds left, a controversial foul was called on Bill Laimbeer, enabling Kareem Abdul-Jabbar to go to the foul line, which has since been dubbed the Phantom Foul. The legend calmly sank two free throws, giving the Lakers a 103–102 victory and helping Los Angeles force a Game 7. Despite a valiant effort by the Pistons, the Lakers managed to escape with a 108–105 win in the deciding game and capture their 5th NBA title of the 1980s. James Worthy scored 36 points, grabbed 16 rebounds, and dished out 10 assists in the seventh game, and was named the NBA Finals MVP for his efforts.

1989
Both the Pistons and Lakers were considered to be the two best teams in the NBA entering the 1989 NBA Finals. Behind the no-nonsense leadership of head coach Chuck Daly, Detroit finished with a franchise best 63–19 record, which was also the best record in the league. After sweeping both the Boston Celtics 3–0 in the first round, and the Milwaukee Bucks 4–0 in the second round, the Pistons eliminated Michael Jordan and the Chicago Bulls in 6 games in the Eastern Conference Finals. Meanwhile, Los Angeles suffered slight slippage in the regular season, finishing with a 57–25 record. However, the Lakers, who still finished first in the Western Conference, compiled an outstanding 11–0 record in the postseason, sweeping the Portland Trail Blazers, Seattle SuperSonics, and Phoenix Suns en route to the finals. Magic Johnson also earned his second NBA MVP award (Johnson, who had already won the award in 1987, would receive his third NBA MVP title in 1990). As the finals began, L.A. was once again favored to eliminate Detroit and successfully three-peat as champions. However, the Pistons were determined to prove that they were ready to overcome the sting of coming up short the previous year, and win the NBA title. L.A.'s hopes for another championship took a turn for the worse when Byron Scott and Johnson both suffered season-ending hamstring injuries. The Pistons' physical style of play and superior defense also proved to be too much for the Lakers to overcome, as Detroit swept Los Angeles in 4 games and captured their 1st ever NBA Championship. Pistons shooting guard Joe Dumars was awarded NBA Finals MVP honors. After the series, Abdul-Jabbar retired. The series would also turn out to be the final time that Pat Riley would make an appearance in the NBA Finals as head coach of the Lakers. This also marked the first time that the NBA Finals ended in a 4-game sweep since the Finals went to the current 2–3–2 format back in 1985. The Pistons successfully defended their crown the following season. They defeated the Trail Blazers in the 1990 NBA Finals 4–1 to repeat as NBA champions.

2004
A whole new of generation of Pistons and Lakers would meet as they squared off again in the 2004 NBA Finals. Los Angeles originally entered the 2003–04 NBA season on a mission to win the championship, due to a multi-talented roster featuring 4 NBA superstars: Shaquille O'Neal, Kobe Bryant, Gary Payton, and Karl Malone. Despite trying to meet high expectations and getting off to a promising start, the Lakers suffered through injuries and turmoil throughout the campaign; Malone struggled with a knee injury which he had to have surgery on, and was limited to playing only 42 games. Payton never grew comfortable learning the nuances of head coach Phil Jackson's triangle offense. Finally, O'Neal and Bryant spent the whole season feuding over who was a more valuable player for the Lakers. Nevertheless, Los Angeles finished with a 56–26 record, winning the Pacific Division title on the last day of the season. Next, the Lakers eliminated the Houston Rockets, San Antonio Spurs, and Minnesota Timberwolves to win the Western Conference crown. The Pistons also struggled through the early part of their season as well. However, their fortunes soon improved vastly thanks to the February acquisition of Rasheed Wallace via trade, and the firm guidance of head coach Larry Brown. Detroit finished with a 54–28 record. Then, they defeated the Milwaukee Bucks, New Jersey Nets, and Indiana Pacers en route to the Eastern Conference title. Just like they had in both 1988 & 1989, the Lakers entered the NBA Finals as the clear favorite to win the championship. Still, the Pistons were not discouraged by their underdog status, stunning Los Angeles with a Game 1 win in L.A. The Lakers pulled out an overtime victory over Detroit in Game 2, thanks to Bryant's game-tying 3-pointer in the final seconds of regulation, enabling L.A. to eventually tie the series. However, as the series shifted to Detroit, the Pistons imposed their will on the Lakers. Their commitment to team basketball and tough, physical defense proved to be insurmountable. L.A.'s title dreams were dashed when Malone reinjured his knee in Game 4, and was unable to suit up for the Lakers in Game 5. The Pistons convincingly won the next 3 games at the Palace of Auburn Hills, and won the series 4–1, capturing their 3rd NBA title overall. At the end of the series, Al Michaels, who was serving as the play-by-play announcer for the NBA on ABC during the finals, observed that even though the Lakers had Hall of Fame players, the Pistons beat L.A. by using players that nobody else wanted. Chauncey Billups, the Pistons' point guard, won the NBA Finals MVP Award. Billups became the first Finals MVP recipient since former Pistons star Joe Dumars to have won the award before making his first NBA All-Star team. Like Dumars, Billups would eventually go on to make multiple appearances in the NBA All-Star Game.

2021
On November 21, 2021, nearly 17 years to the day of the infamous Malice at the Palace, the rivalry got reignited following a brawl that occurred during a game in Detroit. The incident occurred in the third quarter when the Lakers' LeBron James and the Pistons' Isaiah Stewart were jostling for position during a free throw. Their arms appeared to get intertwined and James swung his elbow, striking Stewart, who quickly had blood streaming from above his eye. Stewart was guided away from the spot where the contact occurred by teammates and coaches, though he appeared to become more incensed along the way. He then tried to double back multiple times and run toward James. Stewart was assessed two technical fouls, while James was assessed a flagrant foul 2, and both players were ejected. The next day the NBA announced James had been suspended one game for "recklessly hitting" Pistons' center Stewart in the face during their altercation, while Stewart had been suspended two games for "escalating an on-court altercation by repeatedly and aggressively pursuing" James.

Head to head

Statistics

Common individuals

Players 
The following players have played for both the Pistons and the Lakers in their careers:
The following players have played for both the Lakers and Pistons in their careers:
 Larry Foust – Pistons (–), Lakers (–)
 Adrian Dantley – Lakers (–), Pistons (–)
 Bob McAdoo – Pistons (–), Lakers (–)
 John Salley – Pistons (–), Lakers
 Elden Campbell – Lakers (–), Pistons (–)
Dennis Rodman - Pistons (1986–1993), Lakers (1999)
 Lindsey Hunter – Pistons (–, –), Lakers
 Jodie Meeks - Lakers (–), Pistons (–)
 Steve Blake – Lakers (–), Pistons
 José Calderón – Pistons, Lakers
 Kentavious Caldwell-Pope – Pistons  (–), Lakers (–)
 Wayne Ellington – Lakers, Pistons
 Reggie Bullock – Pistons (–), Lakers
 Avery Bradley – Pistons, Lakers
 Svi Mykhailiuk – Lakers, Pistons  (–)
 Markieff Morris – Pistons, Lakers (–)
 Andre Drummond – Pistons (–), Lakers
 Sekou Doumbouya – Pistons (–), Lakers
 Stanley Johnson – Piston (–), Lakers
 D. J. Augustin – Pistons, Lakers

Others
The following individuals have also played, coached and/or managed both the Pistons and Lakers in their careers:
 Darvin Ham – Pistons (2003–05 player); Lakers (2011–13 assistant coach; 2022–present head coach)

See also
 Bulls–Pistons rivalry
 Celtics–Pistons rivalry
 Celtics–Lakers rivalry
 Lakers–Spurs rivalry
 National Basketball Association rivalries

References

National Basketball Association rivalries
Detroit Pistons
Los Angeles Lakers